The Ifni War, sometimes called the Forgotten War in Spain (la Guerra Olvidada), was a series of armed incursions into Spanish West Africa by Moroccan insurgents that began in October 1957 and culminated with the abortive siege of Sidi Ifni.

The war, which may be seen as part of the general movement of decolonization that swept Africa throughout the latter half of the 20th century, was conducted primarily by elements of the Moroccan Army of Liberation which, no longer tied down in conflicts with the French, committed a significant portion of its resources and manpower to gain independence from Spain.

Background

The city of Sidi Ifni was incorporated into the Spanish Empire in 1860. The following decades of Franco-Spanish collaboration resulted in the establishment and extension of Spanish protectorates south of the city. Spanish influence obtained international recognition at the Berlin Conference of 1884. In 1946, the region's various coastal and inland colonies were consolidated as Spanish West Africa.

When Morocco regained independence from France and Spain in 1956, the country expressed keen interest in all of Spain’s remaining colonial possessions in Morocco, claiming that they were historically and geographically all part of Moroccan territory. Sultan Mohammed V encouraged efforts to re-capture the land and personally funded anti-Spanish conspirators, Moroccan insurgents and local Berber rebels to claim Ifni back for Morocco.

Outbreak
Violent demonstrations against Spanish rule erupted in Ifni on 10 April 1957, followed by civil strife and widespread killings of those loyal to Spain. In response, Spanish dictator Francisco Franco dispatched two battalions of the Spanish Legion, Spain's elite fighting force, to El Aaiún in Saguia el-Hamra in June.

Spanish military mobilisation resulted in the Royal Moroccan Army converging near Ifni. On October 23, 1957, two villages on the outskirts of Sidi Ifni, Goulimine and Bouizakarne, were occupied by 1,500 Moroccan soldiers (Moujahidine).

The encirclement of Ifni was the beginning of the Ifni War. Two more Legion battalions reached Spanish Sahara before the opening of hostilities.

Storming of Ifni
On 21 November, Spanish intelligence in Ifni reported that attacks were imminent by Moroccans and local tribes operating out of Tafraout. Two days later, Spanish lines of communication were cut, and a force of 2,000 Moroccans stormed Spanish garrisons and armories in and around Ifni.

Although the Moroccan drive into Sidi Ifni was repulsed, two nearby Spanish outposts were abandoned in the face of Moroccan attacks and many others remained under heavy siege.

Tiluin
At , 60 Tiradores de Ifni (locally recruited indigenous infantry with Spanish officers and specialist personnel) struggled to hold off a force of several hundred Moroccans. On November 25, a relief attempt was authorised. Five CASA 2.111 bombers (Spanish-built variants of the Heinkel He 111) bombed enemy positions, while an equal number of CASA 352 transports (Spanish-built versions of the Junkers Ju 52/3m) dropped a force of 75 paratroopers into the outpost.

On 3 December, soldiers of the Spanish Legion's 6th battalion (VI Bandera) arrived, breaking the siege and retaking the airfield. All military and civilian personnel were then evacuated overland to Sidi Ifni.

Telata
The relief of Telata was less successful. Leaving Sidi Ifni on 24 November aboard several old trucks, a platoon of the Spanish Legion paratroop battalion under Captain Ortiz de Zárate made slow progress through difficult terrain. This problem was compounded by frequent Moroccan ambushes, which by the next day had left several men wounded and forced the Spaniards off the road. On 26 November, food ran out. The Spanish, low on ammunition, resumed their advance, only to dig in again in the face of repeated enemy attacks.

Rations were dropped by air, but Spanish casualties continued to mount. One of the dead was Captain Ortiz de Zárate. On 2 December, a column of infantry, among them the erstwhile defenders of Telata, broke through the Moroccan lines and managed to escape encirclement. The survivors of the paratroop detachment reached Sidi Ifni once more on 5 December. The company had suffered two dead and fourteen wounded.

Siege of Sidi Ifni
Initial Moroccan and local tribes attacks had been generally successful. In the space of a fortnight, the Moroccans and their tribal allies had asserted control over most of Ifni, isolating inland Spanish units from the capital. Simultaneous attacks had been launched throughout Spanish Sahara, overrunning garrisons and ambushing convoys and patrols.

Consequently, Moroccan units, resupplied and greatly reinforced, tried to surround and besiege Sidi Ifni, hoping to incite a popular uprising. However, the Moroccans underestimated the strength of the Spanish defences. Supplied from the sea by the Spanish Navy and protected by kilometres of trenches and forward outposts, Sidi Ifni, boasting 7,500 defenders by 9 December, proved impregnable. The siege, lasting into June 1958, was uneventful and relatively bloodless, as Spain and Morocco both concentrated resources on Saharan theatres.

Battle of Edchera
In January 1958, Morocco redoubled its commitment to the Spanish campaign, reorganising all army units in Spanish territory as the "Saharan Liberation Army".

On 12 January, a division of the Saharan Liberation Army attacked the Spanish garrison at El Aaiún. Beaten back and forced into retreat by the Spaniards, the army turned its efforts to the southeast. Another opportunity presented itself the next day at Edchera, where two companies of the 13th Legionnaire battalion were conducting a reconnaissance mission. Slipping unseen into the large dunes near the Spanish positions, the Moroccans opened fire.

Ambushed, the Legionnaires struggled to maintain cohesion, driving off attacks with mortar and small arms fire. The 1st platoon stubbornly denied ground to the Moroccans until heavy losses forced it to withdraw. Bloody attacks continued until nightfall, and were fiercely resisted by the Spanish, who inflicted heavy casualties. By nightfall, the Moroccans were too scattered and depleted of men to continue their assault, and retreated into the darkness.

Clearance of Spanish Sahara
In February 1958, a Franco-Spanish combined force launched an offensive that broke up the Moroccan Liberation Army. Between them, France and Spain deployed a joint air fleet of 150 planes. The Spanish were 9,000 strong and the French 5,000.

First to fall were the Moroccan mountain strongholds at Tan-Tan. Bombed from above and rocketed from below, the Liberation Army suffered 150 dead and abandoned its positions.

On February 10, the 4th, 9th, and 13th Spanish Legion battalions, organised into a motorised group, drove the Moroccans from Edchera and advanced to Tafurdat and Smara.

The Spanish army at El Aaiún, in conjunction with French forces from Fort Gouraud, struck the Moroccans on February 21, destroying Saharan Liberation Army concentrations between Bir Nazaran and Ausert.

Consequences

In Ifni, Spanish troops retreated from the territory to a defensive perimeter around Sidi Ifni.

On April 2, 1958, the governments of Spain and Morocco signed the Treaty of Angra de Cintra which was named after the large bay in the area. 

Morocco obtained the region of Tarfaya (Cape Juby), between the river Draa and the parallel 27° 40′, and Ifni (although legally Morocco only gained full control over the territory in 1969), excluding the colony of Spanish Sahara.

Spain retained possession of Ifni until 1969, when, while under some international pressure (resolution 2072 of the United Nations from 1965), it returned the territory to Morocco. Spain kept control of Spanish Sahara until the 1975 Green March prompted it to sign the Madrid Accords with Morocco and Mauritania; it withdrew from the territory in 1976 and Western Sahara was partitioned between Morocco and Mauritania.

Bibliography
 Santamaría, Ramiro. Ifni-Sahara, la guerra ignorada ("Ifni-Sahara, the Ignored War") Dyrsa, Madrid, 1984. The history of the Ifni war told by a specialised journalist in the Western Sahara.
 Casas de la Vega, Rafael. La última guerra de Africa ("The last war of Africa") Servicio de Publicaciones del Estado Mayor del Ejército, Madrid, 1985. Military analysis of the war by a Spanish general.
 Mariñas Romero, Gerardo. "La Legión española en la guerra de Ifni-Sahara" ("The Spanish Legion in the Ifni-Sahara War"). Defensa, nº 117 (1988). Article about the intervention of the Spanish Legion in the Ifni war.
 Belles Gasulla, José. Cabo Jubi-58. Memorias de un teniente de infantería en la campaña Ifni-Sahara ("Cape Jubi-58: Memoirs of an infantry lieutenant in the Ifni-Sahara campaign") Servicio de Publicaciones del Estado Mayor del Ejército, Madrid, 1990. Testimony of a Spanish officer.
 Diego Aguirre, José Ramón. "Ifni, la última guerra colonial española" ("Ifni, the last Spanish colonial war"). Historia 16, nº 167 (1990). Analysis of the Ifni war with unpublished documents.
 Diego Aguirre, José Ramón. La última guerra colonial de España: Ifni-Sahara, 1957–1958 ("The last colonial war of Spain: Ifni-Sahara, 1957–1958"). Algazara, Málaga, 1993.  History of the Ifni war.
 Simón Contreras, Miguel. "Ifni y Sahara, hoy" ("Ifni and Sahara, today"). Ejército, nº 633 (1992). An officer of the Spanish Army revisits the battleground .
 Tamburini, Francesco. "Ifni-Sahara, 1957–1958: una guerra coloniale dimenticata" ("Ifni-Sahara, 1957–1958: a forgotten colonial war"). Eserciti e Storia, no. 42, a. VII, July–August 2007.

See also
List of Spanish Colonial Wars in Morocco
Spanish protectorate in Morocco
Spanish Morocco

References

External links
  The Corner of Sidi Ifni (El Rincón de Sidi Ifni)
Marcelino Sempere Doménech, El Ejército del Aire en la Guerra de Sidi Ifni, Universidad de Murcia  
(In arabic) The forgotten war

Morocco–Spain military relations
Conflicts in 1957
Conflicts in 1958
History of Western Sahara
Separatism in Spain
Wars involving Spain
Wars involving France
Wars involving the states and peoples of Africa
Wars involving Morocco
1957 in Spain
1958 in Spain
Spanish Africa
Spanish Sahara
African resistance to colonialism